WAKM is an AM radio station in Franklin, Tennessee, broadcasting on a frequency of 950 kHz.

History
WAKM first signed on in March 1953, broadcasting from its studio facilities located on Mallory Station Road in Franklin. The station would remain at that location until July 28, 2017, when it moved to new studios on Main Street in the following week, on August 2, 2017.

Programming
WAKM primarily broadcasts a country music format.

WAKM is also noted for its coverage of NASCAR, which comes from both Motor Racing Network & Performance Racing Network.

The station is an affiliate of the Tennessee Titans radio network, carrying football games from the Nashville, Tennessee based NFL Football team, the Tennessee Titans.

WAKM also carries University of Tennessee Volunteers College Football & Men's Basketball games from the Vol Network.

Also since the stations sign on, WAKM has carried the longest running local traders post show titled "Trade Time Live", which airs every weekday at noon.

References

External links

AKM
Country radio stations in the United States